Harchakian is a town and sub-tehsil located on the ranital-32-mile road in Kangra district, Himachal Pradesh.

It contains the office of the executive magistrate. The executive magistrate office serves the common public by giving various services like issuance of community certificates, bonafide certificates and all the matters related to the land.

It has a senior secondary school, SBI branch, HP Grameen Bank, Post office and veteranary hospital.

References

Villages in Kangra district